Tinea aetherea is a species of moth in the family Tineidae. It was described by Charles E. Clarke in 1926. However the placement of this species within the genus Tinea is in doubt. As a result, this species has been referred to as Tinea (s.l.) aetherea. This species is endemic to New Zealand.

The wingspan is 9–10 mm. The forewings are purplish fuscous with grey-ochreous markings. The hindwings are purplish grey with a dark-fuscous subbasal shade.

References

External links
Image of type specimen of Tinea s.l. aetherea.
 

Moths described in 1926
Tineinae
Moths of New Zealand
Endemic fauna of New Zealand
Endemic moths of New Zealand